Qədili is a village in the Qubadli Rayon of Azerbaijan.

References

Populated places in Qubadli District